Lucius Perry Gregg, III (born January 8, 1960) is an American computer scientist and American tennis coach.

Early life
He was the first African American alumnus to be admitted early admission to Harvard University, Yale University, Princeton University, and Massachusetts Institute of Technology. He has a B.A. in mathematics and in computer science from Harvard University and a J.D. from the University of California, Davis. He is the son of Wendell Phillips Academy High School notable alumnus Lucius Perry Gregg, Jr.

Career
He holds mobile device patents for a system for multipath contactless transactions, allowing businesses to accept credit and debit cards without a card terminal reader.

In 2019 Gregg was nominated as the Tim Gullikson ATP Touring Coach of the Year for his work as a professional tennis coach on the ATP Tour.

In 2021 Gregg declared candidacy for the Democratic Party (United States) primary August 23, 2022 U.S. House of Representatives Florida’s 8th Congressional District.

References

1960 births
Living people
Evanston Township High School alumni
American computer scientists
American tennis coaches
Harvard University alumni
UC Davis School of Law alumni